Dandot RS Dalmian (DRS) (Urdu   ڈنڈوت آر ایس ڈالیمان) is a village, union council, and administrative subdivision of Jhelum District (Urdu جہلم) in the Punjab Province of Pakistan. It is part of Pind Dadan Khan Tehsil.

Schools Dandot RS 
Govt Girls Primary School (GGPS) Shireen Abad (dandot Rs), Jhelum

Dandot RS Zip Code 
Dandot R.S. Post zip code Jhelum, Punjab - North: 49064

Dandot Cement 
Dandot RS is a Jhelum And Dandot Is in Chakwal Board Line This Factory

Dandot Cement Plant was installed in 1982 by State Cement Corporation of Pakistan

National Cement plants Dandot RS Jhelum Pakistan.

References 

Villages in Union Council Golepur
Populated places in Tehsil Pind Dadan Khan